Panther is a census-designated place and unincorporated community located in western Daviess County, Kentucky, United States. It is home of Brushy Fork Baptist Church and the Leet's store. It is near the former location of Green Coal Company.

Demographics

History
It is named for Panther Creek. The Post Office was established on May 12, 1881.

References

Unincorporated communities in Daviess County, Kentucky
Unincorporated communities in Kentucky